Rosedale, also known as Wharton House, is a historic plantation house located near Washington, Beaufort County, North Carolina.  It is a large -story, frame dwelling with Greek Revival and Italianate style design elements.  It was built as the home of David Bradley Perry, a prominent Beaufort County planter, and later inherited by United States Congressman and Mrs. John Humphrey Small.

It was listed on the National Register of Historic Places in 1982.

References

Plantation houses in North Carolina
Houses on the National Register of Historic Places in North Carolina
Greek Revival houses in North Carolina
Italianate architecture in North Carolina
Houses in Beaufort County, North Carolina
National Register of Historic Places in Beaufort County, North Carolina